Allodemis is a genus of moths belonging to the subfamily Tortricinae of the family Tortricidae.

Species
Allodemis chelophora (Meyrick, 1910)
Allodemis dionysia Diakonoff, 1983
Allodemis euhelias Diakonoff, 1983
Allodemis fulva Diakonoff, 1983
Allodemis pullatana (Snellen, 1902)
Allodemis stegopa Diakonoff, 1983

See also
List of Tortricidae genera

References

 , 2005: World Catalogue of Insects volume 5 Tortricidae.
 , 1983, Zool. Verh. Leiden 204: 76.

External links
tortricidae.com

Archipini
Tortricidae genera
Moths described in 1983
Taxa named by Alexey Diakonoff